Sinani is a surname. Notable people with the surname include:

Danel Sinani (born 1997), Luxembourgish footballer
Gazmend Sinani (1991–2018), Kosovo Albanian basketball player
Ismet Sinani (born 1999), Kosovan footballer
Sehid Sinani (born 1982), Swiss footballer
Tahir Sinani (1964–2001), Albanian insurgent
Vioresin Sinani (born 1977), 
Boris Naumovich Sinani (1851–1922), Jewish Karaite doctor

References 

Albanian-language surnames